Des Moines Metro Opera is an opera company in Indianola, Iowa, a town of approximately 14,000 inhabitants which lies some  south of Des Moines, Iowa. It was founded by Robert L. Larsen and Douglas Duncan in 1973. The director is Michael Egel.

During its annual summer opera festival, the company performs three mainstage operas in rolling repertory during June and July.

Programming
Most of the company's opera productions are performed at the Blank Center for the Performing Arts on the campus of Simpson College.

In 1986 the company presented a new opera based on Shakespeare's The Tempest, with music by Lee Hoiby and a libretto by Mark Shulgasser.

The company's first performance of an opera in a language other than English was Tosca in 1998, at the Civic Center in Des Moines.

Singers
Singers who had their start with the company include Kimm Julian.

References 
Notes

Sources

External links 
 Des Moines Metro Opera website

Performing arts in Iowa
American opera companies
Culture of Des Moines, Iowa
Tourist attractions in Warren County, Iowa
Musical groups established in 1973
1973 establishments in Iowa